G.I. Joe is an American comic book series published by IDW Publishing, being written by Paul Allor and drawn by pencillers Chris Evenhuis, Niko Walter, Ryan Kelly and Emma Vieceli, alongside colorist Brittany Peer. Based upon the G.I. Joe franchise by Donald Levine and Hasbro, this series is a reboot of the previous comic book series that used to take place in the Hasbro Comic Book Universe.

The series began on September 18, 2019 and concluded on February 17, 2021.

Premise 
When the United States are ruled by the command of COBRA, a secret organization named G.I. Joe must fight back by recruiting citizens, but the propaganda created by COBRA makes the Joes look like public criminals.

Production history

Background 
In May 2008, IDW Publishing obtained the G.I. Joe comic book license from Devil's Due Publishing. After having acquired the comic book licence of various other Hasbro properties throughout the years—such as Transformers, Action Man, Rom, M.A.S.K., Micronauts and Visionaries—IDW announced the Hasbro Reconstruction campaign in January 2016; a launch meant to converge these franchises in the same continuity. In April 2018, it was announced that this shared continuity, the Hasbro Comic Book Universe (HCBU), would end with Transformers: Unicron in November.

Meanwhile, Larry Hama's G.I. Joe: A Real American Hero continues its run until 2022.

Development 
The new G.I. Joe series was announced in June 2019, with writer Paul Allor and artist Chris Evenhuis as the creative team. Allor stated the story is "inspired both by modern warfare – where non-state actors fight vastly overpowered militaries to a perpetual standstill – and World War II, where Great Britain's SOE recruited civilians behind enemy lines. Old-school G.I. Joe fans will absolutely love it and find it true to everything G.I. Joe stands for, and new folks will be attracted to a deeply character-driven tale of hope and humanity, and about the power of resilience in an increasingly unraveling world".

After ten issues, the series concluded with the one-shot titled G.I. Joe: Castle Fall scheduled for February 17, 2021.

Issues

Reception

Collected editions

References

IDW Publishing titles
Comic book reboots
2019 comics debuts
G.I. Joe comics
LGBT-related comics
Comic books suspended due to the COVID-19 pandemic